State Park Place is an unincorporated community in Madison and St. Clair counties, Illinois, United States. State Park Place borders Collinsville to the east and Cahokia Mounds State Historic Site to the west.

References

Unincorporated communities in Madison County, Illinois
Unincorporated communities in St. Clair County, Illinois
Unincorporated communities in Illinois